Princess Bay is one of the southern beaches of Wellington, New Zealand.

Location
It is situated between Houghton Bay and  Te Raekaihau Point, on the rocky shores of the Cook Strait. It comprises a beach that skirts Houghton Bay and contains a regular population of surfers and divers.

Character
Princess Bay is on the Southern Headlands Reserve, and along with other parts of Wellington's South Coast, it is a popular recreational diving and fishing spot. In 2005 the decommissioned F69 Frigate Wellington was sunk off Houghton Bay, and is now an artificial reef and dive location. Princess Bay has a long history as a favourite surf spot of locals, and is an even smaller sister to neighbours Houghton and Lyall Bays.

Aurora Australis
Displays of Aurora Australis are currently able to be seen from this locality, as the light pollution is shielded to some degree by the range of hills along the coastline. 

The dark sky is necessary as most aurorae are weak and barely visible to the naked eye at this latitude, with any increase in light pollution removing such displays from visual identification.

See also
 Te Raekaihau Point
 Lyall Bay
 Kaitiaki

External links
 F69 Dive wreck and artificial reef
 Video of the F69 Frigate Wellington Sinking off Houghton Bay
 Astronomy in New Zealand
 Atmospheric Images from Wellington NZ

Tourist attractions in Wellington City
Beaches of the Wellington Region
Bays of the Wellington Region